Eivindvik is the administrative centre of the municipality of Gulen in Vestland county, Norway. The village is located on the mainland, along the north shore of the Gulafjorden.

Eivindvik is the commercial centre of the municipality as well as the seat of government for the municipality. Gulen Church has been located in Eivindvik for centuries.

This area has an ancient history, since the Gulating met in this area in the years 900—1300, creating laws which governed most of Western Norway.

Name
The municipality of Gulen was originally named after this village. There have been many spelling variations throughout the past few centuries: Evindvig, Evenvig, or Evenvik.  The name of the municipality was officially changed to Gulen on 1 July 1890, but the village name remained as Eivindvik.

Media gallery

References

Villages in Vestland
Gulen